Olari (Finnish) or Olars (Swedish) is a district of the city of Espoo, Finland. Olari is located about 15 kilometres west of central Helsinki, north of the Länsiväylä highway and Matinkylä. The district has a population of about 15,000. The district is famous for its contribution to the Finnish rap culture. One of the most notable landmarks of the district is Olari Church and Parish Centre, designed by architects Simo and Käpy Paavilainen, and completed in 1981.

See also 
 Districts of Espoo

References

External links 
 Olari-Matinkylä local portal website
 Map of Olari

Districts of Espoo